Bitter Forces and Lame Race Horses is an EP by the rock band Fiction Plane, released on 11 July 2005.

Critical reception
In a review for AllMusic, Mark Morton wrote that the EP is "darker in nature" than Fiction Plane's debut album, Everything Will Never Be OK (2003), and described it as a "soulful, somber, and acidic ... successful hybrid of alternative rock balladry and singer-songwriter affectation."

Track listing

Personnel

Fiction Plane
 Seton Daunt – guitar, piano, background vocals
 Joe Sumner – vocals, bass, guitar
 Pete Wilhoit – drums, background vocals

Additional personnel
 Paul Corkett – engineering, mixing, production
 Nick Joplin – engineering
 Mark "Spike" Stent – mixing
 Dan K. Brown – design, illustrations, photography
 Alex Lake – design, illustrations, photography

References

2005 EPs
Fiction Plane albums